Musik und Gesellschaft was a music magazine in the German Democratic Republic.

History 
The music magazine regularly awarded a recording prize.

Chief editors 
 1951–1952 Karl Laux
 1952–1959 Eberhard Rebling.
 1959–1960 Horst Seeger.
 1960–1973 Hansjürgen Schaefer
 1973–1990 Liesel Markowski

Literature
 Bettina Hinterthür: Noten nach Plan. Die Musikverlage in der SBZ, DDR – Zensursystem, zentrale Planwirtschaft und deutsch-deutsche Beziehungen bis Anfang der 1960er Jahre. Franz Steiner Verlag, Stuttgart 2006, .

References

1951 establishments in East Germany
1990 disestablishments in East Germany
Classical music magazines
Defunct magazines published in Germany
Mass media in East Germany
East German music
German-language magazines
Magazines established in 1951
Magazines disestablished in 1990
Magazines published in Berlin
Music magazines published in Germany